Susan Plum (1944) is an American glass and installation artist. Plum was born in Houston, Texas and raised in Mexico City. She attended University of Arizona, the University of the Americas in Mexico City, and the Pilchuck Glass School.

Her work is included in the collections of the Seattle Art Museum, the US Department of State and the Smithsonian American Art Museum.

References

1944 births
20th-century American women artists
21st-century American women artists
Living people
Artists in the Smithsonian American Art Museum collection